Elsberry is a city in Lincoln County, Missouri, United States. The population was 1,937 at the 2020 census.

History
Elsberry was laid out in 1871, and named after one of its founders, Robert T. Elsberry. The town site was platted in 1879. A post office called Elsberry has been in operation since 1879.

Geography
Elsberry is located at  (39.169041, -90.787026).

Climate

Demographics

2010 census
As of the census of 2010, there were 1,934 people, 808 households, and 517 families living in the city. The racial makeup of the city was 94.1% White, 2.4% African American, 1.0% Native American, 0.6% from other races, and 1.9% from two or more races. Hispanic or Latino of any race were 2.0% of the population.

There were 808 households, of which 31.4% had children under the age of 18 living with them, 43.8% were married couples living together, 14.6% had a female householder with no husband present, 5.6% had a male householder with no wife present, and 36.0% were non-families. 30.8% of all households were made up of individuals, and 13.8% had someone living alone who was 65 years of age or older. The average household size was 2.39 and the average family size was 2.97.

The median age in the city was 38.4 years. 24.3% of residents were under the age of 18; 10.1% were between the ages of 18 and 24; 23.3% were from 25 to 44; 26.9% were from 45 to 64; and 15.6% were 65 years of age or older. The gender makeup of the city was 45.9% male and 54.1% female.

2000 census
As of the census of 2000, there were 2,047 people, 779 households, and 552 families living in the city. The racial makeup of the city was 93.65% White, 3.27% African American, 0.64% Native American, 0.15% Asian, 0.64% from other races, and 1.66% from two or more races. Hispanic or Latino of any race were 1.95% of the population.

There were 779 households, out of which 38.3% had children under the age of 18 living with them, 49.7% were married couples living together, 15.3% had a female householder with no husband present, and 29.1% were non-families. 24.4% of all households were made up of individuals, and 11.2% had someone living alone who was 65 years of age or older. The average household size was 2.63 and the average family size was 3.09.

In the city the population was spread out, with 31.4% under the age of 18, 8.7% from 18 to 24, 26.9% from 25 to 44, 19.9% from 45 to 64, and 13.2% who were 65 years of age or older. The median age was 34 years. For every 100 females, there were 87.8 males. For every 100 females age 18 and over, there were 89.6 males.

The median income for a household in the city was $27,917, and the median income for a family was $32,188. Males had a median income of $30,896 versus $20,119 for females. The per capita income for the city was $14,615. About 14.7% of families and 14.7% of the population were below the poverty line, including 18.5% of those under age 18 and 8.8% of those age 65 or over.

Education
Elsberry R-II School District operates one elementary school, one middle school and Elsberry High School.

The town has a lending library, the Joseph R. Palmer Family Memorial Library.

Notable people
 Clarence Cannon, congressman; lived in Elsberry as a boy
 Marc Hill, Major League Baseball player; born in Elsberry in 1952

References

External links
 Official website
 The Elsberry Democrat, local newspaper
 Historic maps of Elsberry in the Sanborn Maps of Missouri Collection at the University of Missouri

Cities in Lincoln County, Missouri
Cities in Missouri